Shane O'Sullivan may refer to:
 Shane O'Sullivan (hurler)
 Shane O'Sullivan (filmmaker)